Rhodospatha is a genus of plant in family Araceae. It is native to South America, Central America, and southern Mexico.

Species
Rhodospatha acosta-solisii Croat - Peru
Rhodospatha arborescens Temponi & Croat - Minas Gerais
Rhodospatha badilloi G.S.Bunting - Venezuela
Rhodospatha bolivarana G.S.Bunting - Bolívar State of southeastern Venezuela
Rhodospatha boliviensis Engl. & K.Krause - Bolivia
Rhodospatha brachypoda G.S.Bunting - Venezuela, Peru, Ecuador, Bolivia, the Guianas
Rhodospatha brent-berlinii Croat - Peru
Rhodospatha cardonae G.S.Bunting - Amazonas State of southern Venezuela
Rhodospatha densinervia Engl. - Colombia, Ecuador
Rhodospatha dissidens Sodiro - Ecuador
Rhodospatha falconensis G.S.Bunting - Falcón State of northwestern Venezuela
Rhodospatha forgetii N.E.Br. - Costa Rica
Rhodospatha guasareensis G.S.Bunting - Colombia, Zulia State of northwestern Venezuela
Rhodospatha herrerae Croat & P.Huang - Colombia
Rhodospatha katipas Croat - Peru
Rhodospatha kraenzlinii Sodiro - Ecuador
Rhodospatha latifolia Poepp. - Brazil, Bolivia, Peru, Ecuador, Colombia, Venezuela, Guyana, French Guiana 
Rhodospatha monsalveae Croat & D.C.Bay - Valle del Cauca in Colombia
Rhodospatha moritziana Schott - Costa Rica, Panama, Peru, Ecuador, Colombia, Venezuela
Rhodospatha mukuntakia Croat  - Bolivia, Peru, Ecuador, Colombia
Rhodospatha oblongata Poepp. - Brazil, Peru, Colombia, Venezuela, the Guianas
Rhodospatha pellucida Croat & Grayum - Costa Rica, Panama, Nicaragua, Ecuador, Colombia 
Rhodospatha perezii G.S.Bunting - northwestern Venezuela
Rhodospatha piushaduka Croat - Peru
Rhodospatha robusta Sodiro - Ecuador
Rhodospatha statutii Sodiro - Ecuador
Rhodospatha steyermarkii G.S.Bunting - Sucre State of northeastern Venezuela
Rhodospatha venosa Gleason - northwestern Brazil, Peru, Colombia, Venezuela, the Guianas
Rhodospatha wendlandii Schott - Tabasco, Central America, Peru, Colombia, Venezuela

References

 
Araceae genera
Taxonomy articles created by Polbot
Taxa named by Eduard Friedrich Poeppig